The 51st Logistics Battalion is a logistics battalion in the Land Component of the Belgian Armed Forces.

Logistics Battalion, 51
Military logistics of Belgium